Gutman is an unincorporated community in Auglaize County, in the U.S. state of Ohio.

History
A post office called Gutman was established in 1884, and remained in operation until 1905. The community was named for the local Gutman family, who kept a store there.

A section of the Toledo and Ohio Central Railroad, later absorbed by the New York Central ran through this community before being abandoned in the 1960s.
A photo of the T and OC depot at Gutman can be found here

References

Unincorporated communities in Auglaize County, Ohio
1884 establishments in Ohio
Populated places established in 1884
Unincorporated communities in Ohio